Band-e Qara (also Romanized as Band-e Qarā’, Band Qorā, and Band-e Qorā‘; also known as Band-e Karīz, Band-e Qārez, and Band-i-Kāriz) is a village in Barrud Rural District, Kuhsorkh County, Razavi Khorasan Province, Iran. At the 2006 census, its population was 556, in 2018 a new Census, the population almost doubled to a whopping 1,005 people.

Historical sites, ancient artifacts and tourism

Band-e Qara Bathhouse 

Band-e Qara Bathhouse is a historical Public bathing related to the Qajar dynasty and is located in Band-e Qara, Razavi Khorasan Province.

Natural Yakhchāl of Band-e Qara 

Natural Yakhchāl of Band-e Qara is a Natural Yakhchāl is located in Band-e Qara, Razavi Khorasan Province.

See also 

 List of cities, towns and villages in Razavi Khorasan Province

References 

Populated places in Kuhsorkh County